Since the Southeast Asian Games began in 1959, it has been held in 15 cities across all Southeast Asian countries except East Timor.

Hosting tally

References

External links
 

host cities
Southeast Asian Games